Mudflats or mud flats, also known as tidal flats or, in Ireland, slob or slobs, are coastal wetlands that form in intertidal areas where sediments have been deposited by tides or rivers. A global analysis published in 2019 suggested that tidal flat ecosystems are as extensive globally as mangroves, covering at least  of the Earth's surface. They are found in sheltered areas such as bays, bayous, lagoons, and estuaries; they are also seen in freshwater lakes and salty lakes (or inland seas) alike, wherein many rivers and creeks end. Mudflats may be viewed geologically as exposed layers of bay mud, resulting from deposition of estuarine silts, clays and aquatic animal detritus. Most of the sediment within a mudflat is within the intertidal zone, and thus the flat is submerged and exposed approximately twice daily.

A recent global remote sensing analysis estimated that approximately 50% of the global extent of tidal flats occurs within eight countries (Indonesia, China, Australia, United States, Canada, India, Brazil, and Myanmar) and that 44% of the world's tidal flats occur within Asia.

In the past tidal flats were considered unhealthy, economically unimportant areas and were often dredged and developed into agricultural land.

On the Baltic Sea coast of Germany in places, mudflats are exposed not by tidal action, but by wind-action driving water away from the shallows into the sea. This kind of wind-affected mudflat is called Windwatt in German.

Ecology

Tidal flats, along with intertidal salt marshes and mangrove forests, are important ecosystems. They usually support a large population of wildlife, and are a key habitat that allows tens of millions of migratory shorebirds to migrate from breeding sites in the northern hemisphere to non-breeding areas in the southern hemisphere. They are often of vital importance to migratory birds, as well as certain species of crabs, mollusks and fish. In the United Kingdom mudflats have been classified as a Biodiversity Action Plan priority habitat.

The maintenance of mudflats is important in preventing coastal erosion. However, mudflats worldwide are under threat from predicted sea level rises, land claims for development, dredging due to shipping purposes, and chemical pollution. In some parts of the world, such as East and South-East Asia, mudflats have been reclaimed for aquaculture, agriculture, and industrial development. For example, around the Yellow Sea region of East Asia, more than 65% of mudflats present in the early 1950s had been destroyed by the late 2000s. It is estimated that up to 16% of the world tidal flats have disappeared since the mid-1980s.

Mudflat sediment deposits are focused into the intertidal zone which is composed of a barren zone and marshes. Within these areas are various ratios of sand and mud that make up the sedimentary layers.  The associated growth of coastal sediment deposits can be attributed to rates of subsidence along with rates of deposition (example: silt transported via river) and changes in sea level.
 
Barren zones extend from the lowest portion of the intertidal zone to the marsh areas. Beginning in close proximity to the tidal bars, sand dominated layers are prominent and become increasingly muddy throughout the tidal channels. Common bedding types include laminated sand, ripple bedding, and bay mud. Bioturbation also has a strong presence in barren zones.

Marshes contain an abundance of herbaceous plants while the sediment layers consist of thin sand and mud layers. Mudcracks are a common as well as wavy bedding planes.  Marshes are also the origins of coal/peat layers because of the abundant decaying plant life.

Salt pans can be distinguished in that they contain thinly laminated layers of clayey silt. The main source of the silt comes from rivers. Dried up mud along with wind erosion forms silt dunes. When flooding, rain or tides come in, the dried sediment is then re-distributed.

Selected example areas

 Arcachon Bay, France 
 Banc d'Arguin, Mauritania
 Great Rann of Kutch, India
 Belhaven, East Lothian Scotland, United Kingdom
 Bridgwater Bay and Morecambe Bay, United Kingdom
 Cape Cod Bay, Massachusetts, United States
 Cook Inlet, Alaska, United States
 Lindisfarne Island, England, United Kingdom
 Minas Basin, Nova Scotia, Canada
 Moreton Bay, Queensland, Australia
 North Slob, Wexford, Ireland
 Padilla Bay, Washington, United States
 Plymouth Bay, Massachusetts, United States
 Port of Tacoma, Washington, United States
 Port Susan, Warm Beach, Washington, United States
 Skagit Bay, Washington
 Snettisham Norfolk England, United Kingdom
 Wadden Sea: Netherlands, Germany, Denmark
 West coast of Andros Island, Bahamas
 Yellow Sea: China, North Korea, South Korea

See also 

 Herringbone cross beds

References

External links

Tidal Flats
Tidal Flats Field Sites
Intertidal Change Explorer

Landforms
Wetlands
Coastal geography